Soriba Soumah (1946 – 11 June 2004), also known as Edenté, was a Guinea international football forward.

Career
Born in Conakry, Soumah played club football for local side Hafia F.C.

Soumah represented Guinea at the 1968 Summer Olympics in Mexico City. He also made several appearances for the senior Guinea national football team, including six FIFA World Cup qualifying matches, and played at the 1970 and 1974 African Cup of Nations finals.

Personal
Soumah died at age 57 on 11 June 2004.

References

External links

Biography at Sports-reference.com
 
 

1946 births
2004 deaths
Sportspeople from Conakry
Guinean footballers
Guinea international footballers
Olympic footballers of Guinea
Footballers at the 1968 Summer Olympics
1970 African Cup of Nations players
1974 African Cup of Nations players
Hafia FC players
Association football forwards